Elections to the Himachal Pradesh Legislative Assembly were held in February 1967 to elect members of the 60 constituencies in Himachal Pradesh, India. The Indian National Congress won the popular vote and a majority of seats and Yashwant Singh Parmar was re-appointed as the Chief Minister of Himachal Pradesh.

State Reorganization
Previous legislative elections in Himachal Pradesh were held in 1952. But under States Reorganisation Act, 1956, Himachal Pradesh became a Union Territory on 1 November 1956, under the direct administration of the President of India and the Himachal Pradesh Legislative Assembly was abolished simultaneously. Under Punjab Reorganisation Act, 1966, following area of Punjab State namely Simla, Kangra, Kulu and Lahul and Spiti Districts, Nalagarh tehsil of Ambala District, Lohara, Amb and Una kanungo circles, some area of Santokhgarh kanungo circle and some other specified area of Una tehsil of Hoshiarpur District besides some parts of Dhar Kalan Kanungo circle of Pathankot tehsil of Gurdaspur District; were merged with Himachal Pradesh on 1 November 1966.

Result

Elected members

See also
List of constituencies of the Himachal Pradesh Legislative Assembly
1967 elections in India

References

State Assembly elections in Himachal Pradesh
1960s in Himachal Pradesh
Himachal